Florence Anderson (1871–1949) was the first female trade union secretary in Victoria, Australia. Anderson was born in Bairnsdale, Victoria. She married John Anderson in 1911 and bore three children. After her husband died she became a cleaner, but according to the Biographical Register of the Australian Labour Movement 1788-1975 she "rebelled from expectation that cleaners take office towels home to launder" and joined the Female Office Cleaners Union part-time from 1916 and later became a full-time worker in 1919. In 1920 she was made the chair of the Worker's Board with Henry E. Bessell and Richard Brooks.

Anderson was elected the Victorian Secretary of the Miscellaneous Workers Union (the "missos") in 1930, holding office until 1946. She was active in advocating for equal pay, in particular for cleaners who were often women and who worked long hours for little pay. In an interview for The Labor Call, Anderson called them "Workers of the Dawn, and Dusk too", and that,

She died at her home in Smith St, North Richmond on December 20, 1949 and was buried at Burwood Cemetery.

References

Trade unionists from Melbourne
1871 births
1949 deaths
19th-century Australian women
20th-century Australian women